Hodne is a Norwegian surname. Notable people with the surname include:

Bjarne Hodne (born 1943), Norwegian folklorist
David Hodne ( 1991 – present), U.S. Army major general
Ketil Hodne (born 1947), Norwegian boxer
Olav Hodne (1921–2009), Norwegian humanitarian and missionary
Salve Hodne (1845–1916), Norwegian businessman and politician
Todd Hodne (1959–2020), American football player, convicted rapist and murderer

Norwegian-language surnames